Alamgir Muhammad Serajuddin is a Bangladeshi academic. He served as the 8th Vice-Chancellor of the University of Chittagong. In 2017, he was awarded Ekushey Padak by the Government of Bangladesh in the education category.

Early life and education
Serajuddin was born on 1 December 1937 to a Bengali Muslim family in Kanchana, Satkania, Chittagong District. In 1959, he graduated from Dhaka University with a first class honours Master of Arts in History. He gained his Doctor of Philosophy degree from the University of London in 1964. In 1967, Serajuddin became a qualified barrister-at-Law from the Lincoln's Inn of London.

Career
Serajuddin returned to Chittagong in the Seventies, where he served as a faculty member of the Department of History at the University of Chittagong. He finished his post-doctoral degree at the University of London in 1974. In 2012, he was made Professor Emeritus of the same university.

References

Living people
People from Satkania Upazila
Vice-Chancellors of the University of Chittagong
Recipients of the Ekushey Padak
Academic staff of the University of Chittagong
Honorary Fellows of Bangla Academy
1937 births
21st-century Bengalis
21st-century Bangladeshi people
21st-century Muslims
Bangladeshi Sunni Muslims
Alumni of the University of London
University of Dhaka alumni
Lincoln's Inn